Mordellistena aegea is a species of beetle in the genus Mordellistena of the family Mordellidae that is endemic to Dodecanese islands. It was discovered in 1949.

References

aegea
Beetles described in 1949